Figaro-ci, Figaro-là is a 1972 French film directed by Hervé Bromberger.

Cast
 Jean-François Poron - Beaumarchais
 Marie-Christine Barrault - Julie
 Yves Rénier - Gudin
 Isabelle Huppert - Pauline
 Alexandre Rignault - Caron, le père de Beaumarchais
 Henri-Jacques Huet - Le duc de Chaulnes
 Edmond Beauchamp - Paris-Duverney
 Jacques Jansen - Le prince de Conti
 André Oumansky - Sartines
 Jacques Bernard - La Blache
 Michèle André - Mme Franquet
 Pierre Negre - Franquet (as Pierre Nègre)
 Hubert de Lapparent - Goetzman
 Michèle Moretti - Mme Goetzman
 Fernand Guiot - Lepautre

See also
 Isabelle Huppert on screen and stage

References

External links

1972 films
French television films
1970s French-language films
Films directed by Hervé Bromberger
1970s French films